Lakisha Kimberly Robinson (born May 10, 1990), known professionally as Kilo Kish, is an American singer-songwriter and visual artist.

Early life
Kilo Kish was born in Orlando, Florida, on May 10, 1990. She attended Glen Rock Elementary School in Bergen County, New Jersey, but later returned to Orlando, where she graduated from Winter Park High School.
 
Aged 18, she received a scholarship to attend the private art college Pratt Institute in New York. While taking a year off, she worked multiple jobs before enrolling in the Fashion Institute of Technology for textile design, from which she graduated in 2012.

Kish began to pursue a musical career when her roommates, Smash Simmons and Mell McCloud, decided to set up an in-home studio, starting a project called the "Kool Kats Klub". It was through this exposure that she initially met Matt Martians of the neo-soul band The Internet, and collaborated on The Jet Age of Tomorrow's "Want you Still" and The Internet's "Ode to a Dream".

Career

2012: Homeschool
Kilo Kish's debut EP, Homeschool, was released on April 2, 2012, and was well received by critics, being labeled as one of the best albums of 2012 by Complex. The EP was produced by past collaborators such as The Internet and Pyramid Vritra of The Jet Age of Tomorrow, who also provided guest vocals on the project.

On July 31, Kish released "Watergun", a song produced by The Internet, via SoundCloud.

On September 17, "Navy" was released on The Blue Rider record label. The release also contained a remix of "Navy" by MeLo-X. A video for "Navy", as directed by Kish with Ben Rayner, premiered on The Fader the same day.

2013: K+
Kish released the mixtape, K+ for free download on February 7, 2013. It featured artists including Childish Gambino, Star Slinger, SBTRKT, A$AP Ferg of A$AP Mob, Earl Sweatshirt, and Matt Martians of OFWGKTA. In December, Kish released K+ THE BOOK, a behind-the-scenes digital art zine, in extension to the mixtape.

2014–2015: Across
Kish's second EP, Across, was released on July 8, 2014, in collaboration with the fashion and record label Maison Kitsune. In the following year, Kish released Across Remixes.

2016: Reflections in Real Time
Kish's first studio album, Reflections in Real Time, was released on February 29, 2016. The song, "Taking Responsibility", from the album was featured in the third episode of the HBO teenage drama television show Euphoria.

2017 
Kish features on "Out of Body" from the deluxe edition of the 2017 Gorillaz album Humanz as well as across the album Big Fish Theory by Vince Staples.

2018: Mothe
Kish released the single, "Elegance", on August 26, 2018. Pitchfork named the song "Best New Track", with Sheldon Pearce commenting that "it is the best Kilo Kish song by a considerable margin, and it hones in on what makes her such an enchanting and elusive artist, using her wispy raps to drift through a warped pop jam." The release of her EP, mothe, followed on September 7, 2018. On July 29, 2019, Kish released an alternative artwork for mothe which has replaced the old artwork on all digital platforms. The cover was shot by photographer Andrew Arthur, with whom she has worked in the past.

2019: Redux
Kish released three singles over the course of two months, beginning in October 2019. "Bite Me" was released on October 17, 2019, and its music video was made available on YouTube the next day. Kish's next singles, "Nice Out", and "Spark" were released on November 7, and November 26, 2019, respectively. All three singles released with accompanying music videos, and were featured on Kish's EP, Redux, released on December 6, 2019. Kish described Redux as 2018 Mothe's "sister project," and has stated that the EP explores the theme of perseverance. This is also Kish's fourth collaboration with recurring producer, Ray Brady.

2021–2022: American Gurl 
On July 23, 2021, Kish released "American Gurl", the first single from her album of the same name. The video for the song was directed by Kish herself and Matt Cowen. "Bloody Future" was made available on August 20, 2021, and on January 28, 2022, Kish released her collaboration with Vince Staples, "New Tricks: Art, Aesthetics, and Money". She explained that the track “was inspired by the old quote warning never to bite the hand that feeds you. And though it provides, I feel yanked around by the players, trends, and expectations of our age and industry. Ever-wanting to bite, question, and change.” On March 25, 2022, Kish released the full album with 14 tracks featuring Miguel, Jean Dawson, Vince Staples, and Jesse Boykins III.

Discography

Studio albums

Mixtapes

EPs

Singles

Music Videos

Guest appearances

References

External links
 
 

1990 births
Living people
Singers from Orlando, Florida
American hip hop singers
Kitsuné artists
Winter Park High School alumni
21st-century American singers
21st-century American women singers
Musicians from Brooklyn
American women hip hop musicians